Unified Medical Information and Analytical System of Moscow (EMIAS) is a complex information system that automatises the booking of hospital visits and work of medical professionals in Moscow city. The system includes online appointment services, Electronic Health Record  management, and Electronic prescribing  based on "Cloud" technology. EMIAS is the digital system designed to increase the quality and access of medical services in public health clinics. The project was designed and is being implemented as part of the «Digital city» program in execution with the Moscow Government's order from April 7, 2014 (as Moscow government amended on 21.05.2013 № 22-PP).

Aims
 
The main goal of EMIAS is to make free medical services more available, superior, and convenient for citizens. This is accomplished by making medical information more accessible to medical professionals thereby saving valuable time on paperwork, scheduling, and in gathering medical information. EMIAS offers the leaders of medical institutions and the leaders within the medical sector, a smart and authentic analysis tool that will result in the effective management of Moscow's health care systems.

General information 
The project is developed and being implemented as part of “Digital city” program by Moscow IT department. As of October 1, 2013, 557 public health facilities including female counselling centers and dental clinics got involved in EMIAS. Furthermore, EMIAS is organizing and uniting information between outpatient and inpatient facilities.

EMIAS is one of the biggest electronic medical systems in Europe involving over 600 medical institutions and 23 000 medical workers. About 7.7 million people are currently using the system and over 114 000 000 transactions have been made within the first year of the system’s launch.

The system allows managing flows of patients, contains outpatient card integrated in the system, and provides an opportunity to manage consolidated managerial accounting and personalized list of medical help. Besides that, the system contains information about availability of the medical institutions and various doctors. EMIAS allows managing medical registers to resolve medical organizing questions concerning different categories of people, having specific diseases.

EMIAS is being implemented in three steps. The first step is switching the registration process to be completely electronic at public clinics and hospitals. This will allow people to schedule a visit to a doctor remotely. The second step of implementation is creating medical records and using electronic prescriptions for each patient which will be consolidated and shared throughout the public medical sector. The third step will be in uniting the public medical sector with the private medical sector through the sharing of medical records and the introduction of EMIAS services.

In 2016, in a study by PricewaterhouseCoopers (PWC) “Cities Managing Data” in the field of healthcare informatization, Moscow took a leading position and became the only one of the cities studied where the Unified Emias City Polyclinics System was fully implemented. In 2021, the EMIAS.Info mobile application was included in the five winners of the EHEALTHCARE LEADERSHIP Awards International Prize, having received an honorary prize in the category of “Best Platform-oriented Appendix”.

Projects

 People’s flow control subsystem 
 Personal record-keeping system 
 Centralized laboratory service 
 Pharmaceutical support 
 NBI (Normative and Background Information) supervision system 
 Consolidated Management Accounting System
 Patient medical portal and apps Emias.Info

Modules

Users
The objects of the automatisation are outpatient medical facilities of Moscow such as:

 Municipal hospitals (adult's and children's)
 Dental clinics
 Female counselling centres 
 Early treatment centres
 Referral hospitals

Achievements
According to the annual competition of Russian Ministry of Communications and ComNews «Best 10 IT projects for public sector 2013», EMIAS was acknowledged "The biggest project in Health Care System» and won «The best IS» in Health Care according to "Global CIO" competition.

Executives
 Yermolaev Artem  - Minister of Moscow Government, Head of Moscow City IT Department
 Makarov Vladimir - Deputy Head of Moscow City IT Department, EMIAS General constructor.

References

External links
emias.info
Facebook: www.facebook.com/EMIAS.info
Facebook: www.facebook.com/moscow.health
Twitter: twitter.com/emias_news

Government of Moscow
Government programs
Healthcare in Russia
Health informatics
Health care software
Electronic health record software